The  is a railway line in Chiba Prefecture, Japan, operated by the East Japan Railway Company (JR East). It connects Kisarazu Station in Kisarazu to Kazusa-Kameyama Station in Kimitsu. The railway route extends through three cities, Kimitsu, Kisarazu, and Sodegaura. It has no double-track section, and trains can pass at only two stations, Yokota Station and Kururi Station. The line runs mostly through rural area and operates at a huge loss.

Stations

Rolling stock
Kururi Line services KiHa E130-100 DMU series in amount of 10 cars.  

Those trains have one-man operation system, so there no conductor need to operate the train. Also, those trains could be doubled or even tripled in rush periods. KiHa 130-100 series starter their operation from 1 December 2012.

Former rolling stock
 KiHa 30 DMU
 KiHa 37 DMU
 KiHa 38 DMU

History
The Chiba Prefectural Government opened the  gauge section from Kisarazu to Kururi as a light railway on 28 December 1912.

In 1922, the Railway Construction Act was amended by the Diet, and a new rail line connecting Kisarazu Station to Ōhara Station on the Sotobō Line via Kururi and Ōtaki, to transect the Bōsō Peninsula, appeared on the list as compensation for the underdeveloped network of roads in the area at that time.

On 1 September 1923, the Kisarazu to Kururi Line was nationalised, and the line was named the Kururi Line under the Japanese Government Railways (JGR) system.

The private Kihara Line from Ōhara Station was extended to Kazusa-Nakano Station in 1934, and it was planned that the Kururi Line and the Kihara Line would be connected to form a single route across the Bōsō Peninsula (which would have been named the Kihara Line). However, due to World War II, the plan was abandoned, and Kururi Line was never to be extended into the most mountainous area of the peninsula. Services on the section from Kururi Station to Kazusa-Kameyama Station were suspended from 1944 to 1947.

New KiHa E130-100 series DMU trains were introduced from 1 December 2012, replacing the ageing KiHa 30/37/38 DMUs.

Problems
The Kururi Line suffers from a small number of passengers and operates at deficit that requires JR East to give it subsidies.
In 2020, fare revenue covered only 0.6% of operation costs for the section between Kururi and Kazusa-Kameyama stations.

References

 
Lines of East Japan Railway Company
Railway lines in Chiba Prefecture
Railway lines opened in 1912
1067 mm gauge railways in Japan
2 ft 6 in gauge railways in Japan
1912 establishments in Japan